F.H. Barber Provincial Park is a provincial park in British Columbia, Canada.  Comprising 8.5 ha of Fraser River floodplain in its natural state, it is one of only two secured public access points to the Fraser between Chilliwack and Hope.  It is located at the confluence of Wahleach Creek (Jones Creek) and the Fraser one mile west of Laidlaw, British Columbia and is bounded on the south by the tracks of the Canadian National Railway.

References

Lower Mainland
Provincial parks of British Columbia
Fraser River
1978 establishments in British Columbia
Protected areas established in 1978